Hunter Craig Kemper (born May 4, 1976) is a triathlete from the United States. He won the silver medal at the 1999 Pan American Games, behind Venezuela's Gilberto González, followed by winning gold four years later at the 2003 Pan American Games. Kemper was on four U.S. Olympic teams as a triathlete, competing at the Summer Olympics in 2000, 2004, 2008, and 2012.

College
He attended Wake Forest University in Winston-Salem, North Carolina, where he was a 4-year member of the Men's Cross Country and Track & Field teams. Kemper graduated in 1998 with a degree in Business Administration.

Triathlete career
Kemper competed at the first Olympic triathlon at the 2000 Summer Olympics in Sydney.  He took seventeenth place with a total time of 1:50:05.56.

Four years later, at the 2004 Summer Olympics in Athens, Kemper competed again.  He moved up to ninth place with a time of 1:52:46.33 on the more rigorous course.

At the 2008 Summer Olympics in Beijing, he finished in seventh place with a time of 1:49:48.75.

At the ITU San Diego Triathlon in 2012, he placed fifth with a time of 1:49:18 qualifying him for the 2012 Summer Olympics in London for the USA Olympic team. He placed fourteenth in those games to lead the U.S. triathlon team.

Kemper is one of only two American male triathletes ever to be ranked world #1 by the International Triathlon Union (ITU) (American Mark Fretta also held the world #1 rank for 4 months in 2006). In July 2006, he won the Life Time Fitness Triathlon in Minneapolis, MN, winning what was at the time the largest purse in professional triathlon competition.

References

 Profile

American male triathletes
Triathletes at the 1999 Pan American Games
Triathletes at the 2000 Summer Olympics
Triathletes at the 2003 Pan American Games
Triathletes at the 2004 Summer Olympics
Triathletes at the 2008 Summer Olympics
Triathletes at the 2012 Summer Olympics
1976 births
Living people
American people of German descent
Lake Brantley High School alumni
Wake Forest University alumni
Sportspeople from Charlotte, North Carolina
Olympic triathletes of the United States
Pan American Games gold medalists for the United States
Pan American Games silver medalists for the United States
Pan American Games medalists in triathlon
Triathletes at the 2015 Pan American Games
Medalists at the 1999 Pan American Games
Medalists at the 2003 Pan American Games
20th-century American people
21st-century American people